Caicumeo or Caycumeo was the local name of the Camino Real in Chiloé Island in Chile. It crossed through dense forest and swamps uniting Castro with Ancud. The road was opened in 1788. According to local lore the name would derive from a villager who cleared the track with the solely aided by a machete. The road was established following the Spanish founded the "city-fort" of Ancud in northern Chiloé leading to increased trade and agricultural expansion.

See also
Huilliche uprising of 1792

References

History of Chiloé
Historical roads